Saghar Pur is a village of Pind Dadan Khan Tehsil, Jhelum District, Punjab Province (Pakistan), Pakistan. It is situated near Salt Range & River Jhelum.

References

 Location of Saghar Pur- Falling Rain Genomics

Villages in Jhelum District